Anathallis bocainensis is a species of orchid plant native to Brazil.

References 

bocainensis
Flora of Brazil
Plants described in 1940